Hou Bin, born in Jiamusi, Heilongjiang Province, in 1975, is a Chinese track and field athlete who specialises in the high jump.

He lost his left leg in an accident at the age of nine. He subsequently became a Paralympian, and represented China at the 1996 Summer Paralympics in Atlanta. He won gold in the high jump with a jump of 1.92 metres. He successfully defended his title by winning gold again at the 2000 and 2004 Paralympics.

Hou was selected to light the Paralympic flame during the Opening Ceremony of the 2008 Summer Paralympics in Beijing. He lifted himself and his wheelchair up on a rope by strength of arms to the top of Beijing National Stadium, where he lit the cauldron to mark the beginning of the Games.

Since retirement, Hou has become a motivational speaker, and in 2013, he launched "Stand Up Again," a fundraising project for injured children who needed prosthetics after the Ya'an and Wenchuan earthquakes.

Notes

Paralympic athletes of China
Athletes (track and field) at the 1996 Summer Paralympics
Athletes (track and field) at the 2000 Summer Paralympics
Athletes (track and field) at the 2004 Summer Paralympics
Paralympic gold medalists for China
1975 births
Living people
Chinese male high jumpers
People from Jiamusi
Athletes from Heilongjiang
Medalists at the 1996 Summer Paralympics
Medalists at the 2000 Summer Paralympics
Medalists at the 2004 Summer Paralympics
Paralympic medalists in athletics (track and field)
High jumpers with limb difference
Paralympic high jumpers
21st-century Chinese people